James "Jim" Dechan (birth unknown - death unknown) was a professional rugby league footballer who played in the 1900s.

Playing career

International honours
Dechan won a cap for Other Nationalities while at Bradford F.C. in 1905 against England.

Championship final appearances
Dechan played , i.e. number 2, in Bradford FC's 5-0 victory over Salford in the Championship tiebreaker during the 1903–04 season at Thrum Hall, Hanson Lane, Halifax on Thursday 28 April 1904, in front of a crowd of 12,000.

Challenge Cup Final appearances
Dechan played right-, i.e. number 3, in Bradford F.C.'s 5-0 victory over Salford in the 1906 Challenge Cup Final during the 1905–06 season at Headingley Rugby Stadium, Leeds, on Saturday 28 April 1906, in front of a crowd of 15,834.

Career records
Dechan was the league's top try-scorer in the 1904–05 season with 31-tries. Jim Dechan holds Bradford F.C.'s "Most Tries In A Game" record with 7-tries against Bramley on Saturday 13 October 1906 (Note: This record is sometimes quoted as being a Bradford Northern/Bradford Bulls record, but this club was formed in 1907 after this record was set, and after Bradford F.C. became an association football (soccer) club.)

References

External links
[http://www.rlhp.co.uk/imagedetail.asp?id=1432 Image 
[http://www.rlhp.co.uk/imagedetail.asp?id=1433 Image 
Search for "James Dechan" at britishnewspaperarchive.co.uk
Search for "Jim Dechan" at britishnewspaperarchive.co.uk

Bradford F.C. players
Hull F.C. players
Other Nationalities rugby league team players
Place of birth missing
Place of death missing
Rugby league centres
Rugby league wingers
Year of birth missing
Year of death missing